Wanganella is a genus of sea snails, marine gastropod mollusks, unassigned in the superfamily Seguenzioidea.

Species
Species within the genus Wanganella include:
 Wanganella lata (Laseron, 1954)
 Wanganella porcellana (Tate & May, 1900)
 Wanganella ruedai (Rolan & Gubbioli, 2000)
Species brought into synonymy
 Wanganella fissura Laseron, 1954: synonym of Wanganella porcellana (Tate & May, 1900)

References

 Kano Y., Chikyu, E. & Warén, A. (2009) Morphological, ecological and molecular characterization of the enigmatic planispiral snail genus Adeuomphalus (Vetigastropoda: Seguenzioidea). Journal of Molluscan Studies, 75:397-418